Giovanni Paolo Panini or Pannini (17 June 1691 – 21 October 1765) was an Italian painter and architect who worked in Rome and is primarily known as one of the vedutisti ("view painters"). As a painter, Panini is best known for his vistas of Rome, in which he took a particular interest in the city's antiquities. Among his most famous works are his view of the interior of the Pantheon (on behalf of Francesco Algarotti), and his vedute—paintings of picture galleries containing views of Rome. Most of his works, especially those of ruins, have a fanciful and unreal embellishment characteristic of capriccio themes. In this they resemble the capricci of Marco Ricci. Panini also painted portraits, including one of Pope Benedict XIV.

Biography
As a young man, Panini trained in his native town of Piacenza, under Giuseppe Natali and Andrea Galluzzi, and with stage designer Francesco Galli-Bibiena. In 1711, he moved to Rome, where he studied drawing with Benedetto Luti.

In Rome, Panini earned a name for himself as a decorator of palaces. Some of his works included the Villa Patrizi (1719–1725), the Palazzo de Carolis (1720), and the Seminario Romano (1721–1722). In 1719, Panini was admitted to the Congregazione dei Virtuosi al Pantheon. He taught in Rome at the Accademia di San Luca and the Académie de France, where he is said to have influenced Jean-Honoré Fragonard. In 1754, he served as the prince (director) of the Accademia di San Luca.

The Spanish monarchs appreciated his work in such a way that, commissioned by Filippo Juvarra, he sent paintings to decorate the Lacquer Room of the Royal Palace of La Granja de San Ildefonso. In addition, King Carlos IV, when he was Prince, bought several of his works that are still preserved in the Prado Museum and in the royal palaces.

Panini died in Rome on 21 October 1765.

Legacy

Panini's studio included Hubert Robert and his son Francesco Panini. His style influenced other vedutisti, such as his pupils Antonio Joli and Charles-Louis Clérisseau, as well as Canaletto and Bernardo Bellotto, who sought to meet the need of visitors for painted "postcards" depicting the Italian environs. Some British landscape painters, such as Marlow, Skelton and Wright of Derby, also imitated his capricci.

In addition to being a painter and architect, Panini was a professor of perspective and optics at the French Academy of Rome.  His masterful use of perspective was later the inspiration for the creation of the "Panini Projection", which is instrumental in rendering panoramic views. 

Panini's works are held in the permanent collections of many museums worldwide, including the Prado Museum, the Louvre, the Museo Nazionale di Capodimonte, the Museo Thyssen-Bornemisza, the Hermitage, the Pushkin Museum, the Staatsgalerie Stuttgart, the Staatliche Museen, the Palazzo del Quirinale, the Toledo Museum of Art, the University of Michigan Museum of Art, the Brooklyn Museum, the Saint Louis Art Museum, the Detroit Institute of Arts, the Museum of Fine Arts Boston, the Getty Center, the Metropolitan Museum of Art, the Nelson-Atkins Museum of Art, the Virginia Museum of Fine Arts, the Walters Art Museum, the Harvard Art Museums, the Philadelphia Museum of Art, and the Indianapolis Museum of Art.

Gallery

History paintings

Capriccios

Veduta (contemporary Rome)

Drawings

References

Further reading

 Arisi, Ferdinando,Giovanni Paolo Panini 1691-1765, Milano, 1993.
 Horak, Marco, Ritornato a Piacenza il dipinto di Panini passato all'asta lo scorso anno a Londra: si tratta dell' "opera prima", pendant di quello esposto alla Glauco Lombardi di Parma, in "Strenna Piacentina 2013", Piacenza, 2013.
 Horak, Marco, Quell'opera prima di Panini gemella del dipinto esposto al Lombardi di Parma, in "L'Urtiga - Quaderni di cultura Piacentina", Piacenza, n. 4, 2013.
 Horak, Marco, L'opera prima del Panini in una collezione privata, in "Panorama Musei", anno XVIII, n.3, dicembre 2013
 Horak, Marco, G.P. Panini al Fine Art Museum di San Francisco, in "Panorama Musei", anno XXI, n. 2, settembre 2016
 Horak, Marco, Giovanni Ghisolfi tra Salvator Rosa e Giovanni Paolo Panini, Piacenza, 2020

External links

Art and the empire city: New York, 1825-1861, an exhibition catalog from The Metropolitan Museum of Art (fully available online as PDF), which contains material on Panini (see index)
Europe in the age of enlightenment and revolution, a catalog from The Metropolitan Museum of Art Libraries (fully available online as PDF), which contains material on Panini (see index)
Capriccio of Roman Ruins with Figures, from the Permanent Collection of the Utah Museum of Fine Arts
Panini at Waddesdon Manor

Italian Baroque painters
1691 births
1765 deaths
Italian decorators
Italian vedutisti
Painters of ruins
People from Piacenza
Italian male painters
18th-century Italian painters
Waddesdon Manor
18th-century Italian architects